Conor Kenny may refer to:
 Conor Kenny (hurler)
 Conor Kenny (rugby union)